Ahmet Altay Cengizer (born 1954) is a Turkish diplomat and the current permanent delegate at the UNESCO for Turkey and a former president of the General Conference of the UNESCO.

Education 
Ahmet Altay Cengizer is a graduate of Boğaziçi University in Istanbul from which he obtained a degree in political sciences.  He followed up on his studies at the London School of Economics where he studied International History.

Diplomatic career 
His diplomatic career began in 1984, and he was deployed to several Turkish embassies since. His diplomatic service at International organizations began in 2001 when he began to serve in the office of the Turkish delegate to the United Nations in New York, to which he was deployed until 2005. From 2005 until 2006 he served as the Turkish ambassador to Tajikistan and from 2009 onwards, he served as the Turkish Ambassador to Ireland until 2016. In October of the same year he was appointed the permanent Turkish delegate to the UNESCO and was later elected to the executive board for the term between 2017 and 2021. He was elected to preside over the General Conference of the UNESCO for the term between 2019 and 2021 in October 2019. His tenure was marked by the Covid 19 pandemic. In November 2021 he was succeeded by Santiago Irazabal Mourao of Brazil.

Views 
He is a supporter of Turkeys accession to the European Union arguing that Turkey is the only Muslim country developing democratically and the most industrially developed between Japan and Austria.

References 

Living people
1954 births
21st-century Turkish diplomats
Ambassadors of Turkey to Ireland
Ambassadors of Turkey to Tajikistan
Alumni of the London School of Economics
Boğaziçi University alumni